Andrew Stewart born on Monday, the 2nd, January 1978. Was a Scottish former professional association footballer who played as a goalkeeper for Partick Thistle and East Fife.

Career
Stewart began his professional career with Dundee United in 1995 but failed to make a first-team appearance, spending time on loan with Partick Thistle and East Fife.

He later signed for East Fife in 1999, where he went on to played 22 games for them.

References

External links

1978 births
Living people
Scottish footballers
Scottish Football League players
Dundee United F.C. players
Partick Thistle F.C. players
East Fife F.C. players
Footballers from Dumfries
Association football goalkeepers